Melissotarsus is a rare African genus of ants in the subfamily Myrmicinae. They are known from the Afrotropics and Malagasy regions, where their nests are located in living wood, built by tunneling through the wood under the bark. They are rarely seen outside of their nests, which may contribute to their perceived rarity. However, they are considered pest insects because of damage they can cause to trees, including economically important ones such as mangos and trees in the family Burseraceae, including Aucoumea klaineana, Dacryodes buettneri,  and Dacryodes edulis.

Melissotarsus live in association with armored scale insects, family Diaspididae. A study in Cameroon estimated that a single Dacryodes edulis tree hosted about 1.5 million Melissotarsus beccarii (larvae included) and half a million Diaspis armored scale insects; the densities were about 43 and 15 thousand M. beccarii and Diaspis per square metre bark, respectively. The ants appear to consume the secretions used to manufacture armored scales because Diaspididae are completely naked when ant-attended; the ant nest itself remains completely hidden under the bark of the tree.

Species
 Melissotarsus beccarii Emery, 1877
 Melissotarsus emeryi Forel, 1907
 Melissotarsus insularis Santschi, 1911
 Melissotarsus weissi Santschi, 1910

References

External links

Myrmicinae
Ant genera
Hymenoptera of Africa
Taxa named by Carlo Emery
Pest insects